The 2014 Judo Grand Prix Havana was held in Havana, Cuba from 6 to 8 June 2014.

Medal summary

Men's events

Women's events

Source Results

Medal table

References

External links
 

2014 IJF World Tour
2014 Judo Grand Prix
Judo
Grand Prix Havana 2014
Judo
Judo